On February 15, 2019, former Massachusetts Governor Bill Weld announced the formation of an exploratory committee to consider running for the Republican nomination in the 2020 United States presidential election. On April 15, 2019 Weld officially announced he would be running for president, challenging incumbent Donald Trump. Weld previously was the 2016 Vice Presidential nominee of the Libertarian Party on the Gary Johnson ticket. Weld suspended his campaign on March 18, 2020. He subsequently endorsed Democratic nominee Joe Biden for president.

February 2019 launch 

On February 15, 2019, Weld officially announced the formation of an exploratory committee in preparing to run for the 2020 Republican Party presidential primaries. He appeared on both Bloomberg News and MSNBC's Morning Joe the next day. On Morning Joe, he criticized Donald Trump as president, with a focus especially on what he labeled bad foreign policy in regards largely to North Korea and Russia.

On April 15, 2019, Weld officially announced his candidacy for the Republican nomination during an appearance on The Lead with Jake Tapper. Weld's campaign was managed by Jennifer Horn, the former chair of the New Hampshire Republican State Committee and also includes Stuart Stevens, a top strategist for Mitt Romney's 2012 presidential campaign. On March 18, 2020, Weld suspended his campaign.

Political positions

Abortion
In May 2019, Weld described himself as "the most pro-choice person you’re ever going to meet." He said that recent abortion laws passed by states, such as Alabama's Human Life Protection Act, left him feeling "terrible". As governor of Massachusetts, Weld introduced a bill increasing ease of access to abortion in the state. In the 1990s, he publicly fought for removing anti-abortion language from the Republican Party platform, despite opposition from social conservatives.

Drugs

Weld believes that drug use should not be a criminal offense.   Weld has also called for federal decriminalization of marijuana and the lowering of the drinking age.

LGBT rights
Weld has been a consistent supporter of LGBT rights, and the right to same-sex marriage.

Economy
Weld has described himself as fiscally conservative, with goals of reducing spending and balancing the budget. For this reason, he has been described as a "classic conservative". He has proposed to drastically reduce military spending, withdraw American forces from foreign engagements, and refocus American politics on domestic issues primarily.

Education
Weld has been a supporter of charter schools, having established the first twenty-five Massachusetts charter schools as governor.

Environment
Weld challenged Trump on the issue of climate disruption, saying that he had made no effort to combat the effects of global warming. "We've got the polar ice cap that's going to melt with devastating consequences if we don’t get carbon out of the atmosphere," Weld told "America's Newsroom," nothing that he would plan ahead for an "environmental catastrophe." Weld supported rejoining the 2015 Paris Agreement, making the United States carbon neutral by 2050, and a carbon fee and dividend program.

On Monday, April 15, 2019, Weld formally announced his candidacy for President of the United States on The Lead with Jake Tapper. Weld received 1.3% of the vote in the Iowa caucuses and one pledged delegate on February 3.

Impeachment

On October 26, 2019, it was reported that while speaking at Tufts University, Weld suggested that Trump might not even appear on the 2020 ballot. Weld noted that choosing a secret vote about impeachment is an option available to the Senate, and that former Senator Jeff Flake suggested that a secret vote in the process could shield senators effectively from adverse political reactions by the "Trump base", thereby freeing them to vote for conviction. Weld estimated that under those circumstances, 30 to 35 votes to convict would be attained easily and that only 20 were needed.

2020 campaign developments

February 2020 
February 3: Weld wins 1.3% of the votes in the Iowa caucuses and one delegate to the Republican National Convention.
February 11: Weld wins 9.1% of the votes in the New Hampshire primary.

March 2020 

 March 3: Weld wins 10.1% of the votes in the Vermont Primary, his best performance of any state.

 March 3: Weld wins 1.52% of the vote in Alabama Primary.

March 18: Weld suspends his campaign.

Endorsements

References

External links
 Official campaign website

Weld
Bill Weld